Richard Wolff may refer to:

Richard Wolff (speedway rider) (born 1976), Czech motorcycle speedway rider
Rick Wolff (writer) (born 1951), former minor league baseball second baseman, coach, author and sports psychologist
Richard Wolff (wrestler) (born 1948), German Olympic wrestler
Richard D. Wolff (born 1942), American Marxian economist

See also
Rikard Wolff, Swedish stage and screen actor and singer
Richard Wolffe (born 1968), British-American journalist
Richard Wolf, American record producer/songwriter/remixer and composer
Ror Wolf (born Richard Georg Wolf, 1932–2020), German writer
Dick Wolf (born 1946), American TV creator
Dick Wolf (American football) (1900–1967), American football player
Rich Wolfe, American sports writer and marketer